70th Brigade may refer to:
 70th Separate Guards Motor Rifle Brigade (Soviet Union)
 70th Mixed Brigade (Spain)
 70th Mechanised Infantry Brigade (Turkey)
 70th Infantry Brigade (United Kingdom)

See also

 70th Division (disambiguation)